Susan Landau may refer to:

 Susan Landau (born 1954), mathematician and computer scientist
 Susan Landau Finch, born Susan Meredith Landau, film producer, writer, and director
 Susan B. Landau (1952–2017), American film and television producer